Walls Can Fall is an album by American country music artist George Jones. This album was released in 1992 (see 1992 in country music) on the MCA Nashville Records. It peaked at number 24 on the Billboard Country Albums chart and number 77 on The Billboard 200 chart. Walls Can Fall went Gold in 1994.

Recording
Walls Can Fall was produced by Emory Gordy, Jr.  Gordy had previously produced albums by Steve Earle and Bill Monroe, among others, and Jones was backed by the usual top players and songwriters in Nashville.  The biggest hit on the album, "I Don't Need Your Rockin' Chair," includes in the final chorus in chronological order: Alan Jackson, T. Graham Brown, Pam Tillis and Patty Loveless, Mark Chesnutt, Travis Tritt, Vince Gill, Joe Diffie, Clint Black, and Garth Brooks. In addition, the music video for the song features George Foreman, but as Bob Allen notes in his book George Jones: The Life and Times of a Honky Tonk Legend, "...all the guest stars, and MCA's formidable promotional muscle notwithstanding, the song barely made it into the top thirty - which, even at that, was considerably better than any other single from Walls Can Fall, a generally excellent album, did."  "I have a theory as to why," Jones would write in his 1996 autobiography I Lived To Tell It All.  "It's because George Jones, the lead singer, is a senior citizen."  That same year, Jones was inducted into the Country Music Hall of Fame; during his acceptance speech, the singer chided country radio for not playing material by older artists.  "I'm sure my remarks, broadcast coast-to-coast and overseas, annoyed a few radio programmers and hurt my own airplay," Jones later wrote in his memoir.  "It went down shortly afterward."  Other notable cuts on the album include "Finally Friday", which got a modest amount of airplay, and a cover of the Merle Haggard honky tonk classic "The Bottle Let Me Down". "You Must Have Walked Across My Mind Again" is a reissue of the exact song Jones had recorded on his 1983 album, Jones Country.

Track listing

Personnel
George Jones – vocals
Reggie Young – guitar
Steve Gibson – guitar
Billy Joe Walker Jr. – guitar
Biff Watson – guitar
Sonny Garrish – pedal steel guitar
Buddy Emmons – pedal steel guitar
John Hughey – pedal steel guitar
Emory Gordy Jr. – bass
Owen Hale – drums
Hargus "Pig" Robbins – piano
John Barlow Jarvis – keyboards
Glen Duncan – fiddle
Stuart Duncan – fiddle
Curtis Young – vocals
Andrea Zonn – vocals
Carol Chase – vocals
Cindy Richardson – vocals
Liana Young – vocals
Patty Loveless – vocals
Vince Gill – vocals
Ron Gaddis - Vocals

Certifications

References

External links
 George Jones' Official Website
 Record Label

1992 albums
George Jones albums
MCA Records albums
Albums produced by Emory Gordy Jr.